The A38 links Strabane, County Tyrone and the A5 through the meadows of the river Foyle and over Lifford Bridge to Lifford, the County Town of County Donegal, where it links into the N14 and the N15.  The N15, which continues into County Donegal to Stranorlar, Donegal Town, Ballyshannon, Bundoran and then leaving County Donegal, before heading to Sligo. The N14, which continues through Rossgeir, Drumbeg to  Letterkenny.

References

Roads in County Tyrone